Matsa may refer to:

 Matzo
 Typhoon Matsa